Violence erupted on 26 November 2016 in the town of Kasese, the capital of the Ugandan Kingdom of Rwenzururu, when Ugandan police raided the government offices of the Rwenzururu kingdom, killing eight Rwenzururian royal guards and arresting two others. According to the government of Uganda, the raid was in response to militant attacks on police posts in the region two weeks earlier, allegedly perpetrated by the royal guards.

On the next day, Uganda's armed forces and police raided the Rwenzururu royal palace after the expiration of an ultimatum issued by the Ugandan government, resulting in the deaths of 87 royal guards and 16 policemen. Following the raids, the Omusinga (king) of Rwenzururu, Charles Mumbere, was arrested and charged with murder.

Background 
The Rwenzururu region is inhabited by the Konjo and Amba peoples, who have fought for secession from the Tooro Kingdom since 1962 under the movement known as "Rwenzururu". The violence reached a height in 1963 and 1964, when Tooro soldiers massacred many Konjo and Amba civilians as they sought control over the lower valleys. The Ugandan army intervened against the separatists, doing such significant damage to the movement was suppressed for some time. The movement however, achieved fame through a local folk epic and remained relevant, eventually gaining autonomy in 1982 and official government recognition as a kingdom in 2008.

After Rwenzururu was recognised by the Ugandan government, violence between the Konjo and Amba peoples became more prevalent, as the Bakonjo generally support the opposition whilst the Baamba generally support the central government. In February and April 2016, violence erupted between the two communities due to disputed local election results and political infighting, leading to the deaths of at least 30 people.

Clashes 
The Uganda National Police raided the government offices of the Rwenzururu kingdom on 26 November 2016, killing eight Rwenzururian royal guards and arresting two others. According to the government of Uganda, the raid was in response to militant attacks on police posts in the region two weeks earlier, allegedly perpetrated by the royal guards.

The next day, on 27 November 2016, two Ugandan policemen were killed by an angry mob of civilians. The police, accompanied by the Uganda People's Defence Force (UPDF), arrived at the Rwenzururu royal palace at around 10:00 am (EAT). Brigadier Peter Elwelu, who was in charge of the soldiers and policemen outside the palace, was ordered to storm the palace in an hour if the conflict had not been resolved peacefully by then. At 11:00 am, Ugandan President Yoweri Museveni issued an ultimatum to Charles Mumbere, the Omusinga (king) of Rwenzururu, demanding that he surrender his guards and their weapons within two hours or he will "face the consequences".  At approximately 1:01 pm, Ugandan security forces stormed the royal palace, and the ensuing firefight resulted in the deaths of 87 royal guards and at least 16 policemen.

According to Atkins Katusabe, a local MP who was part of the negotiating team inside the palace, the raid was conducted despite attempts by the negotiators to create a peaceful resolution to the conflict. Katusabe also claimed that the royal guards were unarmed, and that the reason he and Rwenzururian Prime Minister Johnson Thembo Kitsumbire survived was because Ugandan soldiers had escorted them out just before the raid.

Aftermath 
The Ugandan government gave an official death toll of 103 in March 2017. Human Rights Watch, however, estimated that at least 156 people had been killed in the clashes.

Ugandan authorities arrested and charged over 180 people in the weeks following the clashes. Charles Mumbere was arrested and charged with murder on 30 November 2016. In a court hearing on 13 December 2016, Mumbere received additional charges of terrorism, aggravated robbery and attempted murder. The Prime Minister of Rwenzururu, Johnson Thembo Kitsumbire, was later also arrested at his home in Kasese. The Ugandan government announced on 26 December 2016 that a total of 167 Rwenzururian royal guards had surrendered to Ugandan security forces in return for amnesty. A large number of royal guards opted to go into hiding, fearing for their lives. Many fled to the Democratic Republic of the Congo.

Charles Mumbere, Johnson Thembo Kitsumbire and 138 others who were arrested during the raids appeared at the Jinja High Court on 28 December 2016. The court set Mumbere's bail hearing for 9 January 2017.

By February 2019, 87 royal guards had peacefully returned from their exile after negotiations with the Busongora Development Forum, a local community-based organisation. Meanwhile, UPDF officials argued that exiled royal guards continued to pose a security risk to the region.

See also 
 Rwenzori Mountains
 Rwenzururu movement
 List of massacres in Uganda
 Human rights in Uganda

References 

Kasese District
Kingdom of Rwenzururu
2016 in Uganda
Conflicts in 2016
Wars involving Uganda